Standing Committee on Foreign Affairs is a defunct committee of the Norwegian Parliament responsible for matters related to foreign policy, development assistance, international agreements, Svalbard and the Norwegian polar regions.

Leaders

Members 2005–09

References

Standing committees of the Storting
1917 establishments in Norway